Unión Deportiva Pomar is a Spanish football team based in Pomar de Cinca, in the autonomous community of Aragón. Founded in 1982, it plays in Regional Preferente, holding home games at La Cortada, with a 1,000-seat capacity.

Season to season

1 seasons in Tercera División

External links
futbolaragon.com profile 

Football clubs in Aragon
Association football clubs established in 1982
Divisiones Regionales de Fútbol clubs
1982 establishments in Spain